Closer to the Source may refer to:

 Closer to the Source (Leroy Hutson album)
 Closer to the Source (Dizzy Gillespie album)